Mount Smart (Māori: Rarotonga; officially Rarotonga / Mount Smart and also known as Te Ipu kura a Maki) is one of the volcanoes and Tūpuna Maunga (ancestral mountain) in the Auckland volcanic field. A century of quarrying removed almost all the 87 meter scoria cone along with extensive terracing excavated by Māori. The former quarry is now the site of Mount Smart Stadium.

Geography and history

The volcano erupted around 20,000 years ago. The scoria cone was formerly 87 metres high with a small crater (around 57 m higher than the surrounding land). Lava flowed about 300 hectares from the eruption, reaching the Manukau Harbour at Māngere. It was the site of defensive Māori pā built on extensive excavated terracing.

The name Rarotonga means "the lower south" and was brought from Hawaiki. Rarotonga is where Rakataura, a tohunga of the Tainui waka, first settled in Aotearoa. After a period of time, Rakataura decided to travel south with his wife Kahukeke, who died during the journey. Te Ipu kura a Maki means "the red bowl of Maki".

Rarotonga was renamed Mount Smart by European settlers after Henry Dalton Smart, a lieutenant in the mounted police in the 1840s.

During 1865 to the 1960s Mount Smart was mostly quarried away. Lower southern and eastern slopes remain and were planted in pōhutukawa during the 1940s. At the same time, the quarry was reserved, and Mt Smart Stadium was built in the 1960s.

In the 2014 Treaty of Waitangi settlement between the Crown and the Ngā Mana Whenua o Tāmaki Makaurau collective of 13 Auckland iwi and hapu (also known as the Tāmaki Collective), ownership of the 14 Tūpuna Maunga of Tāmaki Makaurau / Auckland, was vested to the collective, including the volcano officially named Rarotonga / Mount Smart. The legislation specified that the land be held in trust "for the common benefit of Ngā Mana Whenua o Tāmaki Makaurau and the other people of Auckland". The Tūpuna Maunga o Tāmaki Makaurau Authority or Tūpuna Maunga Authority (TMA) is the co-governance organisation established to administer the 14 Tūpuna Maunga. Auckland Council manages the Tūpuna Maunga under the direction of the TMA.

References

Volcanoes of Auckland: A Field Guide. Hayward, B.W.; Auckland University Press, 2019, 335 pp. .

External links
  Early view of unquarried Mount Smart Pa, showing Maori terracing (page 11, at top)
 View from Mount Smart summit in 1923
 Photographs of Mount Smart held in Auckland Libraries' heritage collections.

Auckland volcanic field
Urban forests in New Zealand